Fyles is an English toponymic surname, a variant of Fildes from the regional name Fylde, the western part of the area Amounderness Hundred in Lancashire, England. Notable people with the surname include:

 Faith Fyles (1875–1961), Canadian botanist and illustrator
 Natasha Fyles (born 1978), Australian politician

See also 
 
 Fyles Ongori

References 

English toponymic surnames